MTV Unplugged is the DVD release from Hitomi Yaida of her performance for MTV Unplugged.

Recorded in the Tokyo FM Hall in April 2005, this performance was shown on an episode of MTV Unplugged broadcast on MTV Japan.

Yaida became the 3rd Japanese performing artist to appear on MTV Unplugged, the others being Ken Hirai and Hikaru Utada.

Presented as a 2 DVD package, the 2nd DVD presented a documentary behind-the-scenes of the creation of this recording.

A selection of the songs performed also appeared in audio form on the CD Sound Drop MTV Unplugged+Acoustic Live 2005.

DVD 1 track listing

References

2005 video albums
Hitomi Yaida video albums
Live video albums
MTV Unplugged albums